Chirostomias pliopterus is a species of barbeled dragonfish found in the Atlantic Ocean.  This species grows to a length of  SL.  This species is the only described member of its genus. This scaleless dragonfish was also the first discovered lifeform to emit a red light, with the second being a siphonophore of the genus Erenna. Later, related Stomiid genera Aristostomias, Malacosteus and Pachystomias were also found to emit red light.

References
 

Stomiidae
Taxa named by Charles Tate Regan
Fish described in 1930
Taxa named by Ethelwynn Trewavas